The following is a list of past and present commercial operators and past military operators of the Lockheed L-1011:

Commercial operators

TAAG Angola Airlines

Sky Capital Airlines

Gulf Air

Lloyd Aéreo Boliviano

Air Canada
Air Transat
Royal Aviation
Worldways Canada

Hewa Bora Airways

Air France

LTU International

Cathay Pacific
Dragonair

Air Atlanta Icelandic

Garuda Indonesia
Merpati Nusantara Airlines

Air India
 Ireland
Aer Lingus
 
All Nippon Airways

Air Rum
Barq Aviation
Privilege Jet Airlines
Royal Jordanian Airlines
Sky Gate International Aviation

Globe Jet

SAM Intercontinental

LAM Mozambique Airlines

ADC Airlines

Askari Aviation

AeroPeru
Faucett

LOT Polish Airlines 

TAP Air Portugal
EuroAtlantic Airways
Luzair
Yes - Linhas Aéreas Charter

Saudia

Iberia

Air Lanka

Air Sweden
Blue Scandinavia
Nordic East Airways
Novair

Thai Sky Airlines

BWIA West Indies Airways

Istanbul Airlines
Holiday Airlines

British Airtours
British Airways
Caledonian Airways
TBG Airways
Classic Airways
Court Line

Air America
American International Airlines
American Trans Air
Arrow Air
Delta Air Lines
Eastern Air Lines
Fine Air
Hawaiian Airlines
Kalitta Air / Kitty Hawk Aircargo / American International Airways
Las Vegas Sands Corp.
Orbital Sciences - Northrop Grumman Innovation Systems
Pacific Southwest Airlines
Pan American World Airways
Rich International Airways
Total Air
United Airlines
TWA

PLUNA

JAT Yugoslav Airlines

Military and government operators

Algerian Air Force

Royal Jordanian Air Force

Royal Saudi Air Force

Royal Air Force - Lockheed TriStar (RAF) operated by No. 216 Squadron RAF and retired in 2014.

References

L-1011
Lockheed aircraft